Suman Ratan Singh Rao (born 23 November 1998) is an Indian model and beauty pageant title holder who was crowned Femina Miss India 2019. She represented India at the Miss World 2019 pageant in ExCeL London in United Kingdom, and was crowned as the 2nd runner-up and as Miss World Asia.

Early life and education
Suman Rao was born on 23 November 1998 in Aaidana village, Rajsamand District, Rajasthan. Her father, Ratan Singh Rao, is a jeweller, while mother Sushila Kunwar Rao is a homemaker. She has two brothers, Jitendra and Chirag. Her family moved to Mumbai when she was a year old. She did her schooling at Mahatma School of Academics and Sports in Navi Mumbai and is pursuing Chartered Accountancy course from the Institute of Chartered Accountants of India. She is fluent in English and Hindi, in addition to her mother tongue Mewari. She is also a trained Kathak dancer.

Pageantry
In 2018, she took part in Miss Navi Mumbai contest, where she was crowned as 1st runner-up. She then auditioned for the title of Femina Miss Rajasthan 2019 which she eventually won. She represented the state of Rajasthan at the Femina Miss India 2019 pageant. On 15 June 2019, she was crowned as Femina Miss India World by the outgoing titleholder Anukreethy Vas at Sardar Vallabhbhai Patel Indoor Stadium, Mumbai. During the pageant's sub contest ceremony, she won the 'Miss Rampwalk' award.

Miss World 2019
Rao represented India at the 69th edition of Miss World pageant, where she placed third in the 'Top Model' round and Top 27 in 'Talent' segment. She won the first stage of Head-to-Head Challenge in Group 14, thus qualifying for the succeeding round of the challenge, which was judged by Piers Morgan. She competed against Bangladesh in the round, where she won and secured a spot in the Top 40 of Miss World 2019. 

Rao's Beauty with a Purpose project was also selected in the Top 10. Her campaign is titled ‘Project Pragati’, for which she took initiatives to help the dreams of women in tribal communities by assisting them in acquiring financial independence. She procured machines which aids in the production of aloe vera and rose extracts, gels and shampoo. Thereby, the women could manufacture the products and earn their livelihood from within their village. Her project received support from the Princess Diya Kumari Foundation and through this institution, the women were trained to make handlooms, decorative handicrafts, accessories and jewellery. These products are sold near the Jaipur City Palace and also through an online website. Further, she associated with the Bharat Sevashram Sangha, a non-profit organisation backed by the United Nations, for an even wider reach of their products.

The pageant's finale was held in ExCeL London, United Kingdom, on 14 December 2019, and Rao was the 2nd runner-up to the eventual winner, Toni-Ann Singh from Jamaica. She is the first Indian to be crowned the 2nd runner-up at the Miss World pageant.

Media 
Rao was ranked in The Times Most Desirable Women at No. 2 in 2019.

Music videos

References

External links

Femina Miss India winners
Indian beauty pageant winners
Living people
Miss World 2019 delegates
Female models from Rajasthan
1998 births